Rhyacoschistura is a genus of stone loaches from Laos. It was described in 2019 to accommodate a new species, R. larreci. Additionally, Rhyacoschistura suber was redescribed with new adult specimens and was moved to Rhyacoschistura from Schistura.

Species 
There are currently two described species in the genus:

 Rhyacoschistura larreci 
 Rhyacoschistura suber

References 

Nemacheilidae
Fish of Laos
Ray-finned fish genera
Taxa named by Maurice Kottelat